Six Colours Frenesi is a live video by the Brazilian musician Jupiter Apple. It was originally recorded during a venue at the famous Bar Opinião in Porto Alegre, Rio Grande do Sul on November 23, 2011, but only released in 2014 through the musician's own label, J.A.C.K. Records (J.A.C.K. is an acronym for "Jupiter Apple Corporation and Kingdom", and was also the name of his backing band at the time).

It was the musician's final album prior to his death in the following year.

Track listing
"Modern Kid"
"Querida Superhist x Mr. Frog"
"Síndrome de Pânico"
"...So You Leave the Hall"
"Little Raver"
"Beatle George"
"Plataforma 6"
"As Tortas e as Cucas"
"Eu e Minha Ex"
"A Lad and a Maid in the Bloom"
"Mademoiselle Marchand"
"Lobo da Estepe" (Os Cascavelletes cover)
"Lovely Riverside"
"Six Colours Frenesi"
"Calling All Bands!"
"Essência Interior"
"Head-Head"
"A Marchinha Psicótica de Dr. Soup"
"Cachorro Louco" (TNT cover)
"Um Lugar do Caralho"

Personnel
 Jupiter Apple – lead vocals, production
 Julio Sasquatt – drums
 Julio Cascaes – electric guitar
 Felipe Faraco – bass guitar
 Astronauta Pinguim – keyboards
 Zé Roberto Muniz – photography, cover art
 Roberto Rubim – executive production

References

2014 video albums
Live video albums
2014 live albums